Madong-e Ahmad (also Romanized as Madong-e Aḩmad) is a village in Qaleh Qazi Rural District, Qaleh Qazi District, Bandar Abbas County, Hormozgan Province, Iran. At the 2006 census, its population was 61, in 9 families.

References 

Populated places in Bandar Abbas County